Salutes the Chicago Blues Tradition is a  live album recorded on 7 July 1993 in Geneva, Switzerland by the Art Ensemble of Chicago and released on their own AECO label. It features performances by Lester Bowie, Joseph Jarman, Roscoe Mitchell, Malachi Favors and Don Moye with Chicago Beau, Amina Claudine Myers, Frank Lacy, James Carter and Herb Walker.

Track listing
Disc One
 "Erika/Carefree" (Joseph Jarman/Roscoe Mitchell) - 22:38 
 "Blues For Zazen" (Joseph Jarman) - 21:22 
 "Tin Pan Alley" (Lincoln T Beauchamp, Jr.) - 12:23
Disc Two 
 "I, The Blues" (Lincoln T Beauchamp, Jr.) - 7:23 
 "Hoochie Coochie Man" (Willie Dixon) - 12:17 
 "Night Time Is The Right Time" (Leroy Carr) - 9:31 
 "Odwalla" (Roscoe Mitchell) - 5:55 
 "Got My Mojo Workin'" (Preston Foster, McKinley Morganfield) - 5:49 
Recorded in Geneva, Switzerland on July 7, 1993

Personnel
Lester Bowie: trumpet
Roscoe Mitchell: soprano saxophone, alto saxophone tenor saxophone
Joseph Jarman: soprano saxophone, alto saxophone 
Malachi Favors Maghostut: bass
Don Moye: drums, percussion
Herb Walker: guitar
Chicago Beau: harmonica, vocals 
Amina Claudine Myers: organ, vocals 
James Carter: tenor saxophone
Frank Lacy: trombone

References

Art Ensemble of Chicago live albums
1993 live albums
AECO Records live albums